Umberto Locati, O.P. (1503 – 17 October 1587) was a Roman Catholic prelate who served as Bishop of Bagnoregio (1568–1581).

Biography
Umberto Locati was ordained a priest in the Order of Preachers.  On 5 April 1568, he was appointed during the papacy of Pope Pius V as Bishop of Bagnoregio. On 25 April 1568, he was consecrated bishop by Scipione Rebiba, Cardinal-Priest of Sant'Angelo in Pescheria. He served as Bishop of Bagnoregio until his resignation in 1581. He died on 17 October 1587.

Episcopal succession
While bishop, he was the principal co-consecrator of:

References

External links and additional sources
 (for Chronology of Bishops) 
 (for Chronology of Bishops) 

16th-century Italian Roman Catholic bishops
Bishops appointed by Pope Pius V
Dominican bishops
1503 births
1587 deaths